Shenzhou 11 was a crewed spaceflight of the Shenzhou program of China, launched on 17 October 2016 (16 October UTC) from the Jiuquan Satellite Launch Center. It was China's sixth crewed space mission, at 33 days, it was the longest until the follow up Shenzhou 12 mission which lasted 3 months. Two days after launch, it docked with the Tiangong-2 space laboratory, which had been launched on 15 September 2016. Shenzhou 11 was the 1st and only expedition and mission to Tiangong-2 in this portion of the Tiangong program.

Crew
The crew consisted of two taikonauts. Commander Jing celebrated his 50th birthday while in orbit.

 Back-up crew 

The mission selected two crew instead of three to extend supplies to increase mission length for their long duration stay.

Mission 
The Shenzhou 11 launched at 07:30 on 17 October 2016 local time (23:30 UTC on 16 October) from the Jiuquan Satellite Launch Center using a Long March 2F launch rocket.

The mission's main objective was to rendezvous and dock with the Tiangong-2 space laboratory and gain experience from a 30-day residence, and to test its life-support systems. 

In the two days after the launch, it changed its orbit five times to arrive 52 kilometres behind the Tiangong-2 space lab. It autonomously rendezvoused and docked with Tiangong-2 at 3:24 p.m.

The crew landed successfully after the 33-day mission on 18 November 2016. The reentry module of the Shenzhou 11 spacecraft landed in Dorbod Banner, Inner Mongolia around 2:15 p.m. (China time) after undocking from the space lab on 17 November.

References

External links
Live webcast 
Live webcast 

2016 in China
Human spaceflights
October 2016 events in China
Shenzhou program
Spacecraft launched in 2016
Tiangong program